Manuel Ramos may refer to:

 Manuel Ramos (writer), attorney and crime writer
 Manuel Ramos (boxer) (1942–1999), Mexican boxer
 Manuel Ramos (footballer), Argentine footballer
 Manuel Ramos (football manager) (born 1982), Portuguese football manager
 Manuel Ramos (golfer) (born 1953), Spanish golfer
 Manuel João Ramos (born 1960), Portuguese anthropologist, artist and civil rights advocate
 Manuel Ramos Otero (1948–1990), Puerto Rican writer